Thomas Löfkvist (born 4 April 1984) is a Swedish former professional road bicycle racer who last rode for the UCI Professional Continental team . Since 2015 Thomas Löfkvist is general manager of Swedish professional cycling team Team Tre Berg–PostNord. Löfkvist was a good time trialist with solid climbing abilities, winning the Monte Paschi Eroica in 2009 with a powerful attack during the steep final kilometer ascent. He has previously used, both within and outside of the cycling world, the surname spelling 'Lövkvist'. Beginning with the cycling season of 2010 he is using his legal surname Löfkvist throughout.

Career

Early years
As a junior, Löfkvist was the European mountain bike champion. Aged 19 he won the Individual Time Trial and the Overall Classification of the prestigious Circuit des Ardennes. Löfkvist also finished sixth and wore the leader's jersey in the 2003 Tour de l'Avenir. Following these results he turned professional for the French team  in 2004.

Française des Jeux
Löfkvist's first professional season turned out to be a very successful one. The week after turning 20 he won the last stage of Circuit de la Sarthe with a 171 km breakaway, covering 150 alone after getting rid of Christophe Moreau. The stage win also gave him the Overall Classification, drawing comparisons with Tour de France winners Bernard Hinault and Greg LeMond, who also won the race at the age of 20. Löfkvist finished 10 seconds ahead of Franck Bouyer, who four days later earned his revenge by beating Löfkvist in the French semi-classic Paris–Camembert. Later in the season he also won the Swedish National time trial championships and participated in the 2004 Summer Olympics. In the 2004 Tour de l'Avenir he won the last stage and finished second overall on the same time of the winner, Sylvain Calzati.

Löfkvist began the 2005 season with a 12th place in the Paris–Nice. He made his debut in the Tour de France as the youngest rider at the age of 21. He also finished 4th in the Tour de Pologne and 14th in the Deutschland Tour. He was later named the Swedish Cyclist of the Year. In 2006 he became the Swedish National Road Race champion and was once again the youngest rider of the Tour de France.

In 2007 he finished second in the Critérium International after winning the concluding Time Trial. He also competed in the Tour de France and later finished second in the 14th stage of the Vuelta a España, the best stage result for a Swede in Vuelta a España since 1982. At the age of 23 he had finished his second Grand Tour of the season and the fourth of his career. Löfkvist was the UCI ProTour rider with most competition days (84) in 2007 and he only abandoned in the last stage of Paris–Nice. He covered the third most competition kilometers in the ProTour.

Team Columbia
Löfkvist won the best young rider classification and finished third in the Tirreno–Adriatico. His improvement in stage races became clear after he finished fifth in the Tour de Suisse, ahead of his team leader Kim Kirchen. Löfkvist also took the white jersey from Romain Feillu in the first time trial of the 2008 Tour de France. Löfkvist then finished impressively 12th at the World Championships.

In 2009 he finished 5th at the Tour of California behind Levi Leipheimer and then won the Monte Paschi Eroica, his first win in two years. He also finished fourth in the Tirreno–Adriatico and later wore the pink jersey as leader of the general classification at the 2009 Giro d'Italia.

Team Sky

On 10 September 2009, Löfkvist was presented as a rider for the newly established British , where he has chosen to spell his name 'Löfkvist'. Team Sky officials have said that the name appears as 'Löfkvist' on the rider's passport, and he previously has used that spelling in the Olympic games.

In July 2010, Löfkvist finished 17th in the Tour de France (20 minutes, 46 seconds behind winner Alberto Contador), the highest placed Team Sky rider.

Löfkvist led Team Sky at the 2010 Vuelta a España, but the team withdrew from after Stage 7 following the death of soigneur Txema González.

In the absence of Bradley Wiggins, Löfkvist led Team Sky at the 2011 Giro d'Italia, where he finished 21st overall.

Löfkvist left  at the end of the 2012 season, and joined the new  team for the 2013 season.

In August 2014, Löfkvist announced his retirement at the end of the 2014 season, as he was diagnosed with chronic fatigue.

In November 2014 Löfkvist was announced as general manager of the new Swedish squad Team Tre Berg-Bianchi ahead of the 2015 cycling season.

Career achievements

Major results

2003
 1st  Overall Circuit des Ardennes
2004
 1st  Time trial, National Road Championships
 1st  Overall Circuit de la Sarthe
1st Stage 4
 2nd Paris–Camembert
 2nd Overall Tour de l'Avenir
1st Stage 10
2005
 4th Overall Tour de Pologne
 5th Overall Tour Méditerranéen
2006
 1st  Road race, National Road Championships
2007
 1st Stage 3 (ITT) Critérium International
2008
 2nd Overall Deutschland Tour
1st  Points classification
1st  Young rider classification
 3rd Overall Tirreno–Adriatico
 3rd Grand Prix of Aargau Canton
 5th Coppa Bernocchi
 5th Overall Tour de Suisse
 8th Monte Paschi Eroica
 9th Overall Volta a Catalunya
2009
 1st Monte Paschi Strade Bianche
 1st Stage 5 Sachsen Tour
 Giro d'Italia
1st Stage 1 (TTT)
Held  after Stage 4
Held  after Stages 4–15
 4th Overall Tirreno–Adriatico
1st  Young rider classification
 5th Overall Tour of California
 6th La Flèche Wallonne
2010
 2nd Montepaschi Strade Bianche
 6th Overall Tour du Limousin
2011
 6th Overall Vuelta a Andalucía
 10th Overall Tirreno–Adriatico
2012
 8th Overall Critérium International
2013
 1st  Overall Tour Méditerranéen
 3rd Time trial, National Road Championships

Grand Tour general classification results timeline

References

External links

Palmares on Cycling Base (French)

1984 births
Living people
Sportspeople from Gotland County
Swedish male cyclists
Cyclists at the 2004 Summer Olympics
Cyclists at the 2008 Summer Olympics
Olympic cyclists of Sweden